The 1972 Boston College Eagles football team represented Boston College as an independent during the 1972 NCAA University Division football season. Led by fifth-year head coach Joe Yukica, the Eagles compiled a record of 4–7. Boston College played home games at Alumni Stadium in Chestnut Hill, Massachusetts.

Schedule

References

Boston College
Boston College Eagles football seasons
Boston College Eagles football
Boston College Eagles football